Naajayaz is a 1995 Indian action thriller film directed by Mahesh Bhatt and produced on a budget of 26.8 million. It was a critical and commercial success. It stars Ajay Devgn, Naseeruddin Shah, Juhi Chawla, Deepak Tijori, Gulshan Grover, Ashish Vidyarthi and Reema Lagoo. Naajayaz was theatrically released in India on 17 March 1995. Naajayaz received two nominations at the 41st Filmfare Awards: Best Actor for Devgn and Best Supporting Actor for Shah.

Plot
Inspector Jai (Ajay Devgn) is an upright and fearless cop who is given the job to take down the criminal empire of Raj Solanki (Naseeruddin Shah). Jai and his accomplice Inspector Sandhya (Juhi Chawla), who also happens to be his love, start taking down Raj's empire with gusto. But Raj's cronies and benefactors are not the only ones to be upset by this.

Raj has problems of his own. He does not want his son (Deepak Tijori) to turn into a criminal like him. Raj is also aware of his minion's (Gulshan Grover) discontent; he wants to start many criminal activities that even Raj will not do. Raj tries to stop Jai without applying pressure or brutality, only to meet Jai's mother (Reema Lagoo) and realize that Jai is his son. Now Raj finds himself in a real tight spot.

Jai's mother does not like Jai trying to take down Raj, but Jai is determined. After some time, Jai learns about his relationship with Raj, but continues his job nonetheless. Raj's legitimate son and his minion try to take down Jai individually, without knowing the secret.

How the story ends forms the plot of this film.

Cast

 Naseeruddin Shah as Raj Solanki
 Ajay Devgan as Senior Inspector Jai Bakshi / Jai Solanki
 Juhi Chawla as Senior Inspector#Indian Police Inspector Sandhya
 Deepak Tijori as Deepak Solanki, Jai's brother  
 Reema Lagoo as Naina Bakshi, Jai's mother
 Ashish Vidyarthi as Ratan
 Gulshan Grover as David 
Disco Shanti as Item Dancer
 Tiku Talsania as Assistant Commissioner of Police#India ACP Malhotra Indian Police Service IPS
 Shri Vallabh Vyas as Pascal, David's Father 
 Makrand Deshpande as street singer

Soundtrack
The music for this album was composed by Anu Malik. The biggest hit from soundtrack was the timeless song "Barsat Ke Mausam Mein", composed by Anu Malik and sung by Kumar Sanu and Roop Kumar Rathod. The song was written by Sudarshan Faakir. The poetic depth in the song is excellent.

Soundtrack

References

External links

1990s Hindi-language films
1995 films
Films directed by Mahesh Bhatt
Films scored by Anu Malik